Dobrujevac may refer to:
 Dobrujevac (Aleksinac), a village in Aleksinac, Serbia
 Dobrujevac (Boljevac), a village in Boljevac, Serbia